Martin Munnelly (born November 11, 1969) is a retired American soccer midfielder who played professionally in Major League Soccer and the USISL.

Youth
Munnelly graduated from Chaminade High School. He then attended the Columbia University, playing on the men's soccer team from 1988 to 1991.

Professional
In 1994, Munnelly signed with the Long Island Rough Riders of the USISL. In 1995, Munnelly and his teammates won the USISL championship.  On June 26, 1996, he went on loan to the MetroStars of Major League Soccer for one game. The Rough Riders released Munnelly on July 10, 1997.

Now he works as a Sophomore World History Teacher and Junior American History Teacher at his old High School, Chaminade.

International
In 1989, Munnelly was a member of the United States men's national under-20 soccer team which placed fourth at the 1989 FIFA World Youth Championship.

References

External links
 
 MetroStars: Martin Munnelly
https://www.instagram.com/nade_memes/
https://www.chaminade-hs.org/about/faculty-and-staff

1969 births
Living people
American soccer coaches
American soccer players
Columbia Lions men's soccer players
Long Island Rough Riders players
New York Red Bulls players
Major League Soccer players
A-League (1995–2004) players
United States men's under-20 international soccer players
Association football midfielders